Reginald Higgins (31 March 1877 – 11 February 1933) was a British painter. His work was part of the painting event in the art competition at the 1928 Summer Olympics.

References

1877 births
1933 deaths
20th-century British painters
British male painters
Olympic competitors in art competitions
People from Paddington
19th-century British male artists
20th-century British male artists